Khasan Magometovich Khalmurzaev (born 9 October 1993) is a Russian judoka. Khasan won the gold medal in the –81 kg event at the 2016 Summer Olympics.

At the 2017 World Judo Championships, Khalmurzaev lost the fight to Alexander Wieczerzak in the semifinals, but won the third-place match against Otgonbaataryn Uuganbaatar.

Personal life
Khalmurzaev has a twin brother, Khusen, who is a judoka, too. He also has three older sisters and an older brother. Their father died when Khasan was 14 years old.

Khalmurzaev serves in the separate battalion of the Patrol-Guard Service of the Ministry of Internal Affairs in Ingueshetia. He is a police sergeant.

Khasan married Zalina in Nasyr-Kort, Ingushetia, on 17 September 2017.

Awards
Order of Friendship (25 August 2016) — for high sports achievements at the 21st Summer Olympics in 2016 in Rio de Janeiro (Brazil), for his will for victory and sense of purpose.
Medal "For Service Virtue" (MIA)

References

External links

 
 
 
 

1993 births
Living people
People from Nazran
Russian male judoka
Olympic judoka of Russia
Olympic medalists in judo
Medalists at the 2016 Summer Olympics
Judoka at the 2016 Summer Olympics
Olympic gold medalists for Russia
Judoka at the 2010 Summer Youth Olympics
Russian twins
Twin sportspeople
Universiade medalists in judo
Universiade gold medalists for Russia
Universiade bronze medalists for Russia
Medalists at the 2015 Summer Universiade
21st-century Russian people